Postcards from Buster is a children's television series created by Marc Brown and Natatcha Estébanez for PBS. A spin-off of Brown's other successful series Arthur, Postcards from Buster aired from October 11, 2004, to November 21, 2008, before going on hiatus, returning February 18, 2012, and then ending two days later.

Series overview

Episodes

Backdoor pilot (2003)

Season 1 (2004–05)

Season 2 (2006–07)

Season 3 (2008)
All episodes from Season 3 take place outside of North America.

Season 4 (2012)
All episodes from Season 4 take place outside of North America. This is also the only season to be produced in 16:9 high definition.

References

External links
 

Lists of American children's animated television series episodes
Lists of Canadian children's animated television series episodes